Ana;  1196–d. June 22, 1200) was the princess consort of the Serbian Principality as the wife of Stefan Nemanja (r. 1166–1196). She was of noble descent. Ana took monastic vows in 1196 and was baptized Anastasia, after Anastasia of Sirmium. She is venerated by the Serbian Orthodox Church as Saint Anastasija with her feast day on June 22 (Julian calendar).

Theories of origin

Her origins have never been concluded. The earliest source mentioning her origin was Domentijan (c. 1210 – after 1264), who said of her: "a great princess, daughter of the Byzantine Emperor Romanos", only Romanos IV Diogenes ruled 1068–71, making this genealogy impossible.

Mavro Orbini, writing in 1601, mentioned her as a daughter of the Bosnian Ban. He perhaps mixed her up with the wife of Prince Miroslav, who was the sister of Ban Kulin. However this is not supported by any sources.
Jovan Rajić thought Ana was the daughter of Ban Borić, although this is not supported by any sources. Vaso Glušac believed her to have been the sister of Ban Borić.
Simeon Bogdanović–Siniša claimed that Ana was the daughter of Ban Borić, however, he wrongly thought that Borić and Boris Kalamanos were the same person (when in fact, Boris died in 1154, and Borić was alive in 1163), thus Ana, based on this assumption, would have been the daughter of Boris.
Justin Popović mentioned her to have been the daughter of Manuel I Komnenos, who after the conflict with Uroš II of Serbia wed of his daughter to him in order to make peace.
Other theories include her being a Hungarian princess or "Frankish" (French) princess.

Marriage and descendants
Through the marriage with Stefan Nemanja, they had three sons and three daughters:
Stefan Nemanjić, Stefan Nemanja's successor.
Rastko Nemanjić (Saint Sava) (1171–1236), The first archbishop and patron saint of the Serbian Orthodox Church.
Vukan Nemanjić, Grand Prince of Doclea 1190–1208, and Grand Prince of Serbia 1202–1204.
Jefimija, married Manuel Doukas, Regent of Thesaloniki (+1241).
A daughter who married Tihomir Asen, and gave birth to Bulgarian Tsar Constantine Tih Asen (reigned 1257–1277).

See also 
Nemanjić family tree
List of Serbian saints

References

Sources

|-

12th-century Serbian nuns
Serbian saints of the Eastern Orthodox Church
Medieval Serbian royal consorts
1200 deaths
Date of birth unknown
Nemanjić dynasty
Eastern Orthodox royal saints